Rhagoletis berberidis is an insect species of tephritid or fruit flies in the genus Rhagoletis of the family Tephritidae.

References

berberidis